San Patricio River (Spanish: Río San Patricio) is a river in the municipality of Ponce, Puerto Rico. It is part of the Bucaná River river system via Cerrillos River. San Patricio is one of the 14 rivers in the municipality.

Origin
San Patricio River has its origin in the sector called Corcho, in the municipality of Utuado.

Progression
The river's course is southward from Utuado and into barrio San Patricio of the municipality of Ponce. After progressing south through barrio San Patricio, the river enters barrio Maragüez also in the municipality of Ponce.  From there it continues its southerly progression until it feeds into Río Cerrillos.

See also
 List of rivers of Puerto Rico
 List of rivers of Ponce

References

External links
 USGS Hydrologic Unit Map – Caribbean Region (1974)
 Rios de Puerto Rico

Rivers of Puerto Rico
Rivers of Ponce, Puerto Rico